Borda is a town and suburb of the city of Margao in South Goa district in the state of Goa, India close to the city of Margao.

See also

References 

Cities and towns in South Goa district